See also
, a British destroyer of the Royal Navy in commission from 1917 to the mid-1930s and from 1939 to 1945
Vivacious (drag queen), Jamaican-American drag queen